Robert G. Miller (born 1944) is an American businessman. He is a Chairman Emeritus of Albertsons Companies.

Biography
Miller was born in 1944 in Louisville, Mississippi. He grew up on his maternal grandfather's farm in Mississippi.

Miller began his career in a grocery store. He eventually served as the chairman and CEO of Fred Meyer. During his time as CEO, he led Fred Meyer through their merger with Kroger, in mid-1999. He then served as vice chairman and chief operating officer at Kroger for a brief time before being appointed as chairman and CEO of Rite Aid Corporation. He held the post of CEO of Rite Aid until 2003 and chairman until June 2007, and was a director until 2011.

Miller is a director of Fred Meyer. He formerly served on the boards of Rite Aid, Harrah's Entertainment, Wild Oats Markets and  Caesars Entertainment Corporation. Miller currently serves on the Board of Directors of Albertsons Companies and Jim Pattison Group.

Miller received the Horatio Alger Award in 2012. He was awarded an honorary doctorate from Boise State University in 2018.

References

Living people
1944 births
People from Louisville, Mississippi
Businesspeople from Mississippi
American chairpersons of corporations
American chief executives
American corporate directors